Ajai Vasudev is a film director active in the Malayalam film industry.

Film career
He made his directional movie debut through Rajadhi Raja, which released on 5 September 2014. His second film, again with Mammootty, was Masterpiece. He teamed up with him for the third time for Shylock..He previously worked as assistant director for morethan 25 films before his directorial debut

Filmography

References

External links

Living people
Malayalam film directors
Year of birth missing (living people)
Male actors in Malayalam cinema